The Hit and Run Tour was a concert tour by American recording artist Prince and 3rdeyegirl. The tour consisted of three legs. The first was in the United Kingdom, the second in Europe, and the third in North America.

Personnel
 Prince — Lead vocals and guitar
 Hannah Welton — Drums
 Donna Grantis — Rhythm Guitar
 Ida Kristine Nielsen — Bass
 Joshua Welton — Percussion

Setlist

"Funknroll"
"Take Me with U"
"Raspberry Beret"
"U Got the Look"
"Musicology"
"2Y2D"
"Kiss"
"Empty Room"
"Let's Go Crazy"
"She's Always in My Hair"
"Guitar"
"Plectrumelectrum"
"Dreamer/Fixurlifeup
"Something in the Water (Does Not Compute)"
"Pretzelbodylogic"
"Mutiny"
"Stratus"
"What's My Name"
"How Come U Don't Call Me Anymore?" / "Diamonds and Pearls" 
"The Beautiful Ones" / "Electric Intercourse" / "Venus De Milo"
"Controversy"
"1999"
"Little Red Corvette"
"When Doves Cry" / "Sign o' the Times" / "Alphabet St."
"Forever in My Life" / "Hot Thing" / "Housequake" 
"Nasty Girl" / "The Most Beautiful Girl in the World" / "Blinded"
"Pop Life"/ "I Would Die 4 U"

Encore
"Purple Rain"
"Play That Funky Music"

This setlist was not for every show.

Tour dates

Box office score data

Cancelled shows

References

External links
Prince Tour History & One off Performances

Prince (musician) concert tours
2014 concert tours
2015 concert tours